Sergei Nikolayevich Gorelov (born 29 April 1985) is a Russian former professional football player.

Club career
He made his debut in the Russian Premier League in 2007 for PFC CSKA Moscow.

Honours
 Russian Premier League bronze: 2007.
 Russian Cup winner: 2008 (played in the early stages of the 2007/08 tournament for CSKA).

References

1985 births
Footballers from Moscow
Living people
Russian footballers
Russia under-21 international footballers
Association football defenders
PFC CSKA Moscow players
FC Torpedo Moscow players
FC Dynamo Saint Petersburg players
Russian Premier League players